St Peter's Church or St Peter Apostle Church is a Roman Catholic parish church in Leamington Spa, Warwickshire, England. It was built in 1864 and designed by Henry Clutton in the Gothic Revival style. It is located on Dormer Place, next to the Royal Pump Room Gardens. It is a Grade II listed building.

History

Foundation
In 1822, a mission was started in Leamington Spa. In 1828, from this mission a chapel was built in George Street. The chapel was named St Peter and St George's Chapel and was designed by a local architect, John Russell. It was built in the neoclassical style.

Construction
With the chapel being too small for the increasing Catholic congregation, a new larger church needed to be built. In 1864, the current church and its presbytery were built. It was designed by Henry Clutton in the Gothic Revival style and paid for by a Miss Ellen France with furnishings donated by other people. The building work was done by W. Gascoyne of Leamington. On 17 August 1864, the church was consecrated by the Bishop of Birmingham William Ullathorne. In 1877, the tower and spire were built. The bells were cast by Messrs W. Blews & Sons of Birmingham.

Developments
In December 1883, the nave roof, organ, and a lot of the interior was destroyed in a fire. Restoration was done by G. H. Cox of Birmingham. In November 1884, the church was reopened. In 1894, the chapel on the north transept was added. It was designed by A. J. Pilkington and A. E Purdie.

Parish
St Peter's Church is in the same parish as Our Lady's Church in Lillington. Our Lady's Church was built in 1963, designed by Henry Fedeski and is also a Grade II listed building. The two churches also work with St Joseph's Church in Whitnash. St Peter's Church has three Sunday Masses at 5:00pm on Saturday, and at 9:00am and 11:00am on Sunday.

Interior

See also
 Archdiocese of Birmingham

References

External links
 
 

Buildings and structures in Leamington Spa
Roman Catholic churches in Warwickshire
Grade II listed churches in Warwickshire
Grade II listed Roman Catholic churches in England
Gothic Revival architecture in Warwickshire
Henry Clutton buildings
Gothic Revival church buildings in England
1864 establishments in England
Roman Catholic churches completed in 1864
19th-century Roman Catholic church buildings in the United Kingdom
Religious organizations established in 1864